This is a list of châteaux in Provence-Alpes-Côte d'Azur, France.

Alpes-de-Haute-Provence 

Château d'Allemagne-en-Provence in Allemagne-en-Provence
Château de Castellane in Castellane
Château de la Gabelle in Ferrassières
Château de Gréoux-les-Bains in Gréoux-les-Bains
Château de Sauvan in Mane
Château de Simiane-la-Rotonde in Simiane-la-Rotonde
Citadelle de Sisteron in Sisteron

Alpes-Maritimes 

Château d'Antibes, in Antibes
Château de Cagnes-sur-Mer, in Cagnes-sur-Mer
Château de Cannes, in Cannes
Château de Carros, in Carros
Château de Castellaras, in Mouans-Sartoux
Château de Crémat, in Nice
Palais des Ducs de Savoie, in Nice
Château d'Èze, in Èze
Château de Gourdon, in Gourdon
Palais Lascaris, in Nice
Château de la Napoule, in La Napoule
Château de Nice, in Nice
Château de Roquebrune-Cap-Martin, in Roquebrune-Cap-Martin
Château de Roquefort, in Roquefort-les-Pins
Château Saint-Jeannet, in Saint-Jeannet
Château de Vaugrenier, in Villeneuve-Loubet
Château de Villeneuve, in Vence
Château de Villeneuve-Loubet, in Villeneuve-Loubet
Citadelle Saint-Elme, in Villefranche-sur-Mer

Bouches-du-Rhône 

Château de la Barben, in La Barben
Château de Barbentane in Barbentane
Château des Baux, in Baux-de-Provence
Château de Boulbon, in Boulbon
Château de la Buzine, in Marseille
Chateau de Bruni in Berre-l'Étang
Château des Creissauds, in Aubagne
Château de l'Empéri, in Salon-de-Provence
Château d'If, in Marseille
Château de Marignane, in Marignane
Château de Ners, in Allauch
Château de Puyricard, in Aix-en-Provence
Château de Pélissanne in Pélissanne
Château du roi René, in Tarascon
Fort Saint-Jean, in Marseille
Fort Saint-Nicolas, in Marseille
Château de Saint-Rémy-de-Provence, in Saint-Rémy-de-Provence

Hautes-Alpes 

Château d'Ancelle in Ancelle
Château d'Embrun, in Embrun
Château de Lesdiguières, in Glaizil
Château de Laragne-Montéglin, in Laragne-Montéglin
Place forte de Mont-Dauphin, in Mont-Dauphin
Château de Montorcier, in Saint-Jean-Saint-Nicolas
Château de Saint-Firmin, in Saint-Firmin
Château de Tallard, in Tallard

Var 

Château d'Agay, in Saint-Raphaël
Château d'Aiguines, in Aiguines
Château Aurélien, in Fréjus
Château de Bargème, in Bargème
Fort de Brégançon, in Bormes-les-Mimosas
Château du Castelet, in Castellet
Château Castel-Ombre, in Ollioules
Château de La Colle Noire or Château Dior, in Montauroux
Château d'Entrecasteaux, in Entrecasteaux
Château d'Évenos, in Évenos
Château de Fabrègues, in Aups
Castelas de Forcalqueiret, in Forcalqueiret
Château de Giens, in Hyères
Château de Hyères, in Hyères
Château de La Tourelle, in Ollioules
Château Marguerite, in Ollioules
Château de Montauban, in Ollioules
Château de Montfort-sur-Argens, in Montfort-sur-Argens

Château féodal d'Ollioules, in Ollioules
Second Château d'Ollioules, in Ollioules
Château Raphélis, in Tourtour
Château de Pontevès, in Pontevès (→en)
Château Sainte-Anne in Évenos
Fort de Saint-Tropez, in Saint-Tropez
Château de Taurenne, in Aups
Château de Thoron, in Artignosc-sur-Verdon
Château Vallon, in Ollioules
Château de Vérignon, in Vérignon
Château de Villepey, in Fréjus
Château de Vins-sur-Caramy, in Vins-sur-Caramy
Palais des Comtes de Provence, in Brignoles

Vaucluse 

Château d'Anselme, in Pernes-les-Fontaines
Château d'Ansouis, in Ansouis
Château du Barroux, in Barroux
Château de Cabrières-d'Avignon, in Cabrières-d'Avignon
Château d'Entrechaux, in Entrechaux
Château l'Ermitage in Pernes-les-Fontaines
Château de Gordes, in Gordes
Château de Javon, in Lioux
Château de Lacoste, in Lacoste
Chateau de lioux,  in Lioux
Château de Lourmarin, in Lourmarin
Château du Martinet, in Mazan
Château de Mirabeau, in Mirabeau
Château de Mondragon, in Mondragon
Château de Mornas, in Mornas
Château de Murs, in Murs
Château la Nerthe, in Châteauneuf-du-Pape 
Palais des Papes, in Avignon 
Château de Pétrarque, in Fontaine-de-Vaucluse
Château Saint-Joseph or Château des trois fontaines in Pernes-les-Fontaines
Château Saint-Lambert, in Lioux
Château de Saumane, in Saumane-de-Vaucluse
Château de Thouzon, in Thor
Château d'Uchaux, in Uchaux
Château de Vaison-la-Romaine, in Vaison-la-Romaine
Château de Val-Seille, in Courthézon

See also 

 List of castles in France

Notes and references 

 Provence-Alpes-Côte d'Azur